Wong Kam-po SBS MH (born 13 March 1973) is a Hong Kong racing cyclist. A specialist in road bicycle racing, at age 34 he became a track cycling world champion in the scratch race of the 2007 World Championships, which was not his specialty. 

Wong Kam-po is a five-time Olympian (the most of any Hong Kong athlete) and much-lauded sports icon. He won Asian Games individual road race three times (1998, 2006, 2010) under competition from Pro tour cyclists of Central Asia countries such as Kazakhstan. He won also track World Cup twice. Latterly, he was a coach with the Hong Kong cycling national set-up.

Biography

Early career and Asian Games gold medalist
Wong Kam-po joined the Hong Kong cycling team in 1990. He quit the team after allegedly fighting with a teammate. After meeting his current coach , he rejoined the team and began a successful career, winning golds in the National Games of China (1997 and 2001) and the Asian Games (1998, 2006, 2010). His 1997 win of the Philippine Marlboro Tour was the only championship by a non-Filipino in the event.

In 1992, he was banned from international races for one year for deserting the trouble-plagued 1992 pre-Olympic training squad in France, in support of his coach Chow Tat-ming who was in dispute with the Hong Kong Cycling Association over wages. Wong returned to racing in the opening race of the 1993-94 season. He won his third Asian Games Gold Medal in Guangzhou.

2007 World Champion in scratch race
A specialist in road bicycle racing, at age 34 he became a track cycling world champion in the scratch race of the 2007 World Championships, which is not his specialty. In the race, he overtook the lead pack with nine laps remaining and crossed the finishing line at 17 minutes 45 seconds. He earned the right to wear the Rainbow Jersey for the year 2007-08.

2008 and 2012 Olympics
Wong performed well at the 2007 UCI B World Championships road race, with a 4th-place finish. He qualified for the track cycling points race of the 2008 Beijing Olympics and finished at the 15th out of 23 cyclists. He is the flag bearer for Hong Kong.

At the 2012 London Olympics, Wong Kam-Po was the sole Hong Kong rider to attend Men's road race. He finished 37th, just 40 seconds behind winner Alexander Vinokurov.

As a sports icon
Wong Kam-Po is a consistent performer. During his lengthy career, he is always able to get precious win in international sports events for Hong Kong. 
He got "Best of the Best" title of Hong Kong Sports Stars Award in 2006, 2007 and 2010.

In 2007 he became the first HongKonger World Champion cyclist and thereby became the sports icon of Hong Kong. 

On 29 June 2007, Hu Jintao, the President of China, visited Hong Kong and met Wong. Hu commented, "you brought glory for Hong Kong and for your country. You are a darling more precious than gold." (Chinese: 你為香港、為國家爭得了榮譽，你是比黃金還珍貴的寶貝) Hu's remarks became a viral wordplay on Wong Kam-po's name, as Po means darling and Wong Kam means gold.

After Wong Kam-Po won his third Asian Games Gold Medal in Guangzhou, Hong Kong's Secretary for Home Affairs Tsang Tak-sing said, "I would like to pay my particular tribute to our cyclist Wong Kam-po who has won three gold, one silver and one bronze, including the gold medal grabbed today, during his various performances at the Asian Games. He epitomises Hong Kong people's determination and perseverance. This is legendary."

Wong was the first Hong Kong rider to gain Category One status in Europe.

After professional cyclist career
Wong Kam-Po became a coach of Hong Kong National cycling team after retirement in 2013. In 2017, Wong left coach position and joined Sports Federation and Olympic Committee of Hong Kong.

Brand Spokesman and TV advertisement

Wong Kam-Po was spokesman of Giant Bicycles, KMC Chain, Polar cycling computer covering Greater China Regions. 

He is also Hong Kong region spokesman of Nike, Uniqlo, Panasonic etc. 

PO is the protagonist of commercial TV advertisements including

2007 : Hong Kong School of Motoring - Safety drive.

2011 : Beauty Choice - Skeleton Plus.

2011 : Dah Sing Life Insurance - Hong Kong Spirit.

2015 : Dah Sing Life Insurance - Wong Kam Po vs Shark.

2022 : Panasonic - Golden Rice Cooker.

2023 Asian Games bid
Wong Kam-po is a supporter of Hong Kong's 2023 Asian Games bid. On 29 November 2010, speaking at the Legislative Council Home Affairs Panel special meeting on the proposed hosting of the 2023 Asian Games, Wong Kam-po said political parties' resistance to the proposal broke his heart. He said Hong Kong needs the spirit of sport, urging legislators to view the issue from a long-term and global perspective.

Palmarès

1995
1st Tour de Okinawa
1st Pacific Ocean Games
1997
 1st General Classification Tour of the Philippines
1998
 1st Tour de Okinawa
1999
 1st General Classification Tour of South China Sea
2000
 1st Stage 4 Tour de Langkawi
 1st Tour de Okinawa
 1st in Stage 3 Tour of South China Sea
2001
 1st Meridian Circuit, Englewood, Colorado (USA)
 1st Stage 10 Superweek International Cycling Classic (USA)
 1st Road Race, Asian Championships
 1st General Classification Tour of South China Sea
 1st Stage 2
 1st Stage 3
 1st Stage 4
 Tour de Langkawi
1st Asian Rider Classification
2002
 3rd Road Race, Asian Championships
 3rd Road Race, Asian Games
 1st Stage 5 Tour of Wellington
 1st Stage 7 Tour of Wellington
 3rd Langnau (SUI)
 1st Stage 4 Tour of Qinghai Lake
2003
 1st Steinfurt (GER)
 1st Stage 3 Tour Nord-Isère (FRA)
 1st Stage 1 Tour de Korea
 1st Stage 5 Tour de Korea
 1st Gippingen (SUI)
 1st Stage 1 Tour of Qinghai Lake
 2nd General Classification Tour of South China Sea
1st Stage 2
2004
 2nd Points Race, Asian Championships
 3rd Scratch Race, Asian Championships
 1st General Classification Tour de Hokkaido
1st Stage 1
 1st Stage 5 Tour d'Indonesia, Madiun (IDN)
 1st Tour de Okinawa (JPN)
 3rd General Classification Tour of South China Sea
2005
 1st Stage 7 Tour of South China Sea
 1st Stage 1 Tour of Siam
 1st in Stage 2 Tour of China, Hefei (CHN)
 1st in Stage 3 Tour of China, Hefei (CHN)
 1st in Stage 4 Tour of China, Hefei (CHN)
 1st in Stage 9 Tour d'Indonesia, DenPasar (IDN)
 2nd in General Classification Tour of South China Sea (HKG)
1st in Stage 2
1st in Stage 4
1st in Stage 5
1st in Stage 6

2006
 1st GP des fêtes du Coux et Bigaroque (FRA)
 1st Stage 3 Cepa Tour, Hong Kong, Asia World-Expo (HKG)
 1st Stage 4 Cepa Tour, Hong Kong Shatin (HKG)
 1st Stage 1 Tour of Japan, Osaka (JPN)
 1st Road Race, Asian Games
 1st Stage 4 Tour of South China Sea
2007
 1st Stage 5 Jelajah Malaysia, Taiping (MAS)
 1st Stage 2 Tour de Taiwan, Tainan (TPE)
 1st Scratch Race, World Championships
 2nd Hong Kong National Road Race Championships
2008
 1st Scratch Race, Track World Cup,Los Angeles (USA)
 1st in Stage 1 Tour de Taiwan, Love River (TPE)
 1st in Stage 7 Tour de Taiwan, Jingmao (TPE)
2009
 1st Point Race, Track World Cup, Copenhagen
2010
 1st Road Race, Asian Games
 2nd Point Race, Asian Games
2012
 1st Stage 2 Tour de Taiwan 
 37th overall Men's road race, Summer Olympics

2009 National Games assault incident
In the week of 16 October, Wong Kam-po was preparing for the 11th National Games in Shandong. In preparing for the event, Wong and his team were 10 minutes early, and the security guards did not let them enter the venue. The team was then assaulted by the security. Cyclist Wong Kam-po was pushed down to the floor by the guards. Hong Kong Sports Institute coach Zhang Pak-ming (張百鳴) was surrounded by four security guards and beaten. His leg was injured. A threat was also made to destroy the Hong Kong team's car. The incident was reported to the police, after which they were allowed to enter the venue.  President of the Sports Federation and Olympic Committee of Hong Kong, China, Timothy Fok, expressed concern about the case.

See also
 Kwok Ho Ting, another World Champion track cyclist from Hong Kong
 Wai Sze Lee, Hong Kong track racing cyclist

References

External links
 Profile at doha-2006.com
 Profile at cyclingnews.com
 Profile at Hong Kong Olympic Committee
 Cyclingnews.com interview 2007

1973 births
Living people
Hong Kong male cyclists
Olympic cyclists of Hong Kong
Cyclists at the 1996 Summer Olympics
Cyclists at the 2000 Summer Olympics
Cyclists at the 2004 Summer Olympics
Cyclists at the 2008 Summer Olympics
Cyclists at the 2012 Summer Olympics
UCI Track Cycling World Champions (men)
Asian Games medalists in cycling
Cyclists at the 1994 Asian Games
Cyclists at the 1998 Asian Games
Cyclists at the 2002 Asian Games
Cyclists at the 2006 Asian Games
Cyclists at the 2010 Asian Games
Members of the Election Committee of Hong Kong, 2012–2017
Members of the Election Committee of Hong Kong, 2017–2021
Asian Games gold medalists for Hong Kong
Asian Games silver medalists for Hong Kong
Asian Games bronze medalists for Hong Kong
Medalists at the 1998 Asian Games
Medalists at the 2002 Asian Games
Medalists at the 2006 Asian Games
Medalists at the 2010 Asian Games
Hong Kong track cyclists